Tappenden is a surname. Notable people with the surname include:

 Dennis Tappenden, Canadian provincial policeman
 Edward Tappenden (1876–1944), English bowls player
 Nicola Tappenden (born 1982), English model